John Soursby Glover Jr. (born August 7, 1944) is an American actor, known for a range of villainous roles in films and television, including Daniel Clamp in  Gremlins 2: The New Batch and Lionel Luthor on the Superman-inspired television series Smallville. He is also the voice of Riddler in the DC Animated Universe.

Early life
Glover was born in Kingston, New York and raised in Salisbury, Maryland, the son of Cade (née Mullins) and John Soursby Glover, a television salesman. Glover attended Wicomico High School and acted at Towson University.

Glover began his career at the Barter Theatre in Abingdon, Virginia, and later studied acting at the Beverly Hills Playhouse under Milton Katselas.

Career
Glover began his career in television, playing a mentally disturbed kidnapper who kidnapped Joanne, the lead character on Search for Tomorrow. One of his early film performances was a small but pivotal role as a U.S. diplomat in White Nights. His other roles include Alan Raimy in 52 Pick-Up, Bryce Cummings in Scrooged, "Tony Gateworth in Masquerade", Daniel Clamp in Gremlins 2: The New Batch, a mobster in Payback, an advertising spokesman in RoboCop 2, Derek Mills in Night of the Running Man, the Riddler in Batman: The Animated Series, Doctor Jason Woodrue in Batman & Robin, Verad in the Star Trek: Deep Space Nine episode "Invasive Procedures", the Devil in the series Brimstone, and a recurring role in The Days and Nights of Molly Dodd as Cousin Jerry, from Bal'mer, a relative whom no one actually seemed to know.

In 1987, he appeared in the Miami Vice episode "Lend Me an Ear" as Steve Duddy. He also appeared in two episodes of Murder, She Wrote, the first one being "One White Rose for Death" in which he played East German Franz Mueller. Mueller wishes to defect to the United States, but his sister is a celebrated concert violinist. They both become caught up in a case of murder at the British Embassy. The other episode was "When Thieves Fall Out," where he played Andrew Durbin, a man wrongly accused of stealing bonds. He appeared in the TV movie An Early Frost in 1985, the first TV film to confront the issue of AIDS, and received an Emmy nomination for his performance as a gay AIDS patient. In 1986, he appeared in the TV film Apology with Lesley Ann Warren.

He appeared in the role of Max Brodsky, an inmate in concentration camps and later a fighter for Israel's independence, in Ian Sharp's 1989 TV miniseries Twist of Fate (also known as Pursuit). That same year, he played a hard-driving, low-on-morals district sales manager in HBO's Traveling Man. He also received a 1994 Emmy nomination for Outstanding Guest Actor in a Comedy Series for his appearance in Frasier.

Glover is perhaps best known for the role as Lionel Luthor on Smallville from 2001 to 2008 where he first appeared as a guest actor in the show's first season and then appeared as a full cast member from seasons two to seven. He later returned in 2010 and 2011 for the tenth and final season as a parallel universe version of the character.

He had a small appearance in the Woody Allen film Annie Hall (1977) in a flashback in which he tells the title character, "Touch my heart. With your foot."  He had a recurring role in Law & Order: Criminal Intent as Declan Gage, an old friend and mentor to Detective Robert Goren. On ABC's Brothers & Sisters he played Henry (the boyfriend of Saul Holden) in 2009. In Heroes he had a brief appearance as Samson Gray, the father of Sylar.

He had made notable appearances on stage, winning a Tony Award for Featured Actor in a Play for his dual roles in the Broadway play Love! Valour! Compassion!, which he reprised in the film version. In 2004, he performed with the Philadelphia Theatre Company staging of Edward Albee's The Goat, or Who Is Sylvia?

He also appeared as "man in the chair/narrator" in The Drowsy Chaperone on Broadway during summer 2007. He played the role of Lucky in a Broadway production of Samuel Beckett's Waiting for Godot, for which he earned a Tony Award nomination for Best Performance by a Featured Actor in a Play. In 2014, he appeared as Leonato in the Shakespeare in the Park production of Much Ado About Nothing.

He played Telemachus in Yuri Rasovsky's Peabody Award-winning radio dramatization of The Odyssey of Homer and has played in several radio plays of the LA Theatre Works. Glover is receiving increasing recognition for narrating audiobooks. In 2011, he performed the audiobook version of Ghost Story, the thirteenth novel in Jim Butcher's The Dresden Files series. In October/November 2011, he performed in David Bar Katz's drama The Atmosphere of Memory at the Bank Street Theatre in New York City, co-starring with Ellen Burstyn in a LAByrinth production. He played the role of Uncle Ben in the 2012 Broadway production of Arthur Miller's Death of a Salesman, directed by Mike Nichols. He is seen rehearsing the role of John Kreese in behind-the-scenes pre-production footage from The Karate Kid, indicating he may have been considered for that role. In 2013, Glover starred in the horror anthology Sanitarium. He also guest-starred in an episode of Agent Carter. Glover has done various voice-over work for several projects related to Tron: Legacy: the villainous character Abraxas in Tron: Evolution, and Dyson in Tron: Uprising.  In 2014, he guest-starred on The Blacklist in the episode titled "Berlin".

Personal life
Glover is gay. He married sculptor Adam Kurtzman in 2016. They began dating in 1993. According to Glover, he slept with Freddie Mercury in the 1970s.

Glover is involved with the Alzheimer's Association. His father had Alzheimer's disease, leading Glover to become more active in charity and activism surrounding the disorder.

Filmography

Film

Television

Video games

Audiobooks

References

External links

 
 
 
 
 
 
 Interview with John Glover

1944 births
Living people
Male actors from Maryland
American male film actors
American male stage actors
American male television actors
American male voice actors
Drama Desk Award winners
People from Salisbury, Maryland
Tony Award winners
Towson University alumni
American gay actors
People from Kingston, New York
LGBT people from Maryland
20th-century American male actors
21st-century American male actors